Shmuel Hadas (1931 – January 2010) was an Israeli diplomat. He was born to a Zionist Jewish family in Argentina. In 1953, he emigrated to Israel. In 1964 joined the Israeli Ministry of Foreign Affairs and was Ambassador to Bolivia from 1971 until 1975. In January 1986, he became the first Israeli ambassador to Spain, and in 1994 the first Israeli ambassador to the Holy See, a position he held until 1997.

In 1997, he retired from diplomatic work and engaged in academic and cultural work.

See also
Israel–Spain relations

Notes

External links
 
 

1931 births
2010 deaths
Ambassadors of Israel to Spain
Ambassadors of Israel to the Holy See
Argentine Zionists
Argentine emigrants to Israel
Argentine Jews
Israeli Jews
Ambassadors of Israel to Bolivia
20th-century diplomats